Jalan Monfort Lama (Selangor state route JKR B9) is a major road in Klang Valley, Selangor, Malaysia. It goes from Guthrie Corridor Expressway to Persiaran Tebar Layar.

List of interchange

Roads in Selangor